Capetí is a town in the Darién province of Panama.

Sources 
World Gazeteer: Panama – World-Gazetteer.com

Populated places in Comarca Emberá-Wounaan